Steklozavoda is a rural locality (a settlement) in Tatarobashmakovsky Selsoviet, Privolzhsky District, Astrakhan Oblast, Russia. The population was 958 as of 2010. There are 13 streets.

Geography 
Steklozavoda is located 31 km southwest of Nachalovo (the district's administrative centre) by road. Tatarskaya Bashmakovka is the nearest rural locality.

References 

Rural localities in Privolzhsky District, Astrakhan Oblast